Stereogram may refer to:

 Stereogram or stereoscopic image, see stereoscopy
 Autostereogram, a three-dimensional image puzzle
 A sound system, see high fidelity
A music centre with the integration of the record player and the wireless receiver, sometimes called radiograms.

See also 
 Steriogram, a punk rock band from New Zealand